Castello Caracciolo (Italian for Caracciolo Castle)  is a  Middle Ages castle in Tocco da Casauria, Province of Pescara (Abruzzo).

History

Architecture

References

External links

Caracciolo
Tocco da Casauria